{{DISPLAYTITLE:C18H18O8}}
The molecular formula C18H18O8 (exact mass : 362.10016755) may refer to :
 Crotepoxide ((+)-Crotepoxide, CAS : 20421-13-0), a compound found in Kaempferia rotunda, Piper attenuatum, Piper kadsura or Croton macrostachys
 2,3-Dihydroirigenin (CAS : 372104-59-1), a compound found in Belamcanda chinensis
 Flagranone B (CAS : 255064-42-7), a compound found in Duddingtonia flagrans
 Kinotannic acid, a tannin-type compound found in kino gum
 Methyl asterrate (CAS : 59170-17-1), a compound found in Ruprechtia tangarana or Aspergillus sp. 
 Morintrifolin B (CAS : 1004987-19-2), a compound found in Morinda citrifolia
 5,7,3'-Trihydroxy-6,4',5'-trimethoxyflavanone (CAS : 310888-07-4), a compound found in Greigia sphacelata